The Kiski School (formerly the Kiskiminetas Springs School and often known simply as Kiski or Kiski Prep) is an independent, all-boys college-preparatory boarding school in Saltsburg, Pennsylvania, United States. Founded in 1888, Kiski is the oldest remaining non-military all-boys boarding school in the United States.

Kiski educates students in grades 9–12, along with a post-graduate (PG) year. Kiski has an enrollment of approximately 180, with international students from 23 different countries. For 2023, Niche ranked Kiski 4th best all-boy high school in Pennsylvania.

History 

In 1888, Andrew W. Wilson founded the school on a wooded hill overlooking the Kiskiminetas River separating Westmoreland County from Indiana County. The site had once been a summer resort and mineral spa. In the school's first catalog, printed in 1888, Wilson stated that the goal was to establish "a boys' school of high order that would prepare graduates to enter any American college or scientific school." There were two other elements of the founding mission. First, "to train and develop the moral faculties which at this period of life are so susceptible to culture." Second, "to afford all the comforts and as many as possible of the pleasures and advantages of home, during this period of training."

Forty-two students had graduated from the school by 1894; 26 of them went to Princeton University. The original faculty consisted of just Wilson (who had graduated from Princeton and the University of Pennsylvania Law School) and school co-founder R. William Fair, who taught mathematics. Wilson led the school through its first four decades with the assistance of his wife, daughters, sons-in-law, and close friends.

Notably, Alexander James Inglis's first professional job was as a Latin teacher at the school during the 1902–1903 school year. On 6 May 1905, the Psi chapter of the Gamma Delta Psi fraternity, a high school fraternity, was founded at the school.

Kiski's athletics program was of some renown in the early 1900s. In 1929, collegiate football scholarships were banned nationally amid the Great Depression. The effects of this ban led Fred Lewis Pattee, a Penn State professor, to compare the university's team to Kiski's. Pattee remarked that the Penn State football team's schedule that year should not include any team "harder than Kiski."

William H. MacColl succeeded Wilson as president in 1930. James L. Marks Sr., who served as dean, and Colonel John J. Daub, who worked as the school's registrar, were also influential early faculty and administrators. By 1937, the school had four administrators and ten faculty, teaching mathematics, history, Latin, English language, Spanish language, German language, geometry, French language, science, and instrumental music. At this time, the school used a preceptoral system, in which the school's students were divided into four groups. The school assigned each group to one of the school's four principals and officers for personalized academic counseling.

L. Montgomery Clark was elected president of Kiski's board of trustees in 1941 and was appointed Head of School in 1942. Kiski carried out many campus additions and improvements under Clark's leadership. In 1946, Wes Fesler, coach of the Pitt football team, conducted a fall training camp for the team on the campus.

John A. Pidgeon, who was then Deerfield Academy's assistant headmaster, succeeded Clark upon retirement in 1957. Kiski undertook additions and improvements to the facilities and grew its academic reputation and endowment under Pidgeon's 45-year leadership. Under Pidgeon, Kiski built four new dormitories and renovated others. Kiski also constructed a new classroom building, dining hall, library, fine arts center, and administrative complex. Since 1998, Kiski has provided every student with a laptop.

In 2002, the school appointed Christopher A. Brueningsen as Head of School. In 2005, Kiski reinstated a day student program that allows students to attend school without residing on campus. Since 2005, five of the six dormitories have undergone significant renovations to improve their sustainability measures and amenities while maintaining student capacity.

In 2009, the school constructed a student center to serve as the social hub of campus, house the college counseling office, and host events throughout the year. In 2014, the school resurfaced the running track surrounding a multi-purpose turf field.

In 2015, the school renovated the Ross Athletic Center, expanding it to include a new fitness center and multi-use gymnasium. The school also expanded academic facilities in 2015 by adding a Makerspace, a do-it-yourself (DIY) workshop and fabrication studio, and completing the Zeigler Science Center in 2019.

Governance 
A board of trustees governs Kiski. As of 2021, John Jacob chairs the board; Ellen Swank is the board's vice-chair. Additional board members include:

Admissions 
Kiski is a selective school, which chooses its student body from a pool of applicants. Kiski utilizes the Standard Application Online (SAO) to evaluate prospective students.

Application Timeline
Parents and students may begin the September application process for the following year's admission. The school requires each applicant to visit the campus and interview. Kiski's Admission Committee begins meeting in February each year to review applications for the next school year. The school generally notifies candidates of admission decisions by 10 March every year. The school typically requires parents to submit enrollment contracts and deposits by 10 April.

Day Students
While Kiski is predominately a boarding institution, it has a small day student population. The school accepts day students living within a short driving distance of the campus.

Post-Graduates
Kiski accepts  postgraduate students who have already achieved their high school diploma and pursue additional secondary education before college. PG students can compete in the school's athletics program and participate in school activities.

Naval Academy Foundation
Kiski partners with the United States Naval Academy to prepare candidates for the Naval Academy. USNA candidates enroll in Kiski's postgraduate program, complete five to six core classes, and participate in athletic programs and other extracurricular activities. The school has been enrolling Naval Academy Foundation candidates since the late 1960s.

Demographics

Curriculum 
Kiski provides a college preparatory curriculum in mathematics, science, world languages, the arts, English language, history, electives, and programs in health and wellness, ethics, and personal development. Kiski offers a range of honors, advanced, and independent study courses. Kiski's STEAM, the school's ninth-grade science course, focuses on science, technology, engineering, arts, and math.

Kiski's Leadership and Character Development Program provides experiences that range from Maker workshops to explorations of sustainability and community service work. The school also organizes trips to Gettysburg and Washington, D.C.

The school is affiliated with the Cum Laude Society and National Honor Society, which recognize academic achievement.

Grades
The school's teachers grade students each quarter. The head of school individually meets with students to report their academic progress after each grading period. Quarterly grade reports are available to both students and parents online. Students receive percentage grades for each marking period based on academic performance. The school also assigns each student an "effort grade" on a scale of A (outstanding effort) through F (deplorable effort) to grade a given student's efforts within a course, in addition to academic grades.

Students who distinguish themselves scholastically through ability and effort may be eligible for special recognition:

Honor Roll. Average of 85% or above, with no grade lower than 70% and not more than
one effort grade below "C."

High Honor Roll. Average of 95% or above, with no grade lower than 80% and not
more than one effort grade below "C."

Effort Honor Roll. At least four "A" effort grades, with no effort grade below "B."

The school publishes these three lists at the end of each academic quarter. The school accords special privileges to students who have earned a place on one of these lists.

The school confers the academic title of "valedictorian" upon the member of the graduating class with the highest cumulative weighted grade point average based on coursework completed at Kiski during the junior and senior years. The valedictorian has the opportunity to deliver an address at Commencement.

Graduation requirements
Every candidate for graduation must complete twenty credits, including:

Evening study hall
Each evening from 19:15–20:45, Monday through Thursday, the school requires all students to engage in academic pursuits. The evening study time allows students to visit their teachers' homes for extra help and general coursework assistance. Kiski encourages students to seek out teachers, most of whom live on campus.

Extracurricular activities

Athletics
Kiski emphasizes athletics, requiring students to participate in one sport every season. Kiski has established 23 athletic teams, including:

Kiski athletics predominantly occur in the school's 75,000 square foot (7,000 m²) Ross Athletic Center, on the high school track, nine-hole golf course, campus cross-country trails, or baseball and soccer facilities.

Activities
Prefects
Kiski's student governance relies upon prefects. Prefects act as resident assistants as well as the school's student leadership. Prefects are assigned to live in the dormitories of first- and second-year students. Among other responsibilities, prefects counsel younger students and help dorm masters with evening study hall and lights-out. During the fourth academic quarter, the faculty and matriculating prefects elect boys to serve as prefects for the next school year. Kiski prefects answer to a senior prefect known as the Head Prefect, the student body leader.

The Cougar Cup
The school participates in a "Cougar Cup" competition each school year. Each student is assigned to be either a member of a Loyalhanna team or a Conemaugh team. The year-long competition includes both athletic and academic challenges.

Clubs
Clubs at Kiski are largely student-organized and vary from year to year. The school has historically seen students organize the following clubs, among others:

Traditions

School dress code
During the academic day, meals, and school assemblies, all students must wear a coat and tie following a school dress code. Students must wear a sport or suit coat, dress shirt, tie, belted trousers, leather dress shoes, and dress socks. Students must wear a white dress shirt for formal evening meals.

Students must wear gray dress pants with a belt, a white shirt, a tie, a blue blazer, and dress shoes for special school events.

Upon graduation, the school awards students a black and white striped tie.

Campus 
The 350-acre campus overlooks the small town of Saltsburg, PA, 30 miles east of Pittsburgh, PA.

Buildings
Athletic Complex
The Carroll "Beano" Cook Outdoor Athletic Center is the school's outdoor athletic complex. The Orr Track and Field consists of an outdoor track and turf field lined for football, soccer, and lacrosse.

Ross Athletic Center
The Ross Athletic Center (RAC) is the school's indoor 75,000 square-ft athletic center. The RAC includes the Jacob Multi-Purpose Gymnasium, a soccer, lacrosse, tennis, and baseball training area, and an indoor walking track. The RAC also includes weight and cardio training rooms, athletic training and health suite, Basketball court, wrestling and baseball room, and the McCutcheon Natatorium. The Ross Athletic Center also houses athletic department offices and film/meeting rooms. It features upgraded locker equipment rooms and storage areas. The athletic center's façade keeps with the traditional Kiski campus-wide appearance, but the inside is modern.

Turley Dining Hall
Turley Dining Hall is the school's dining facility. Kiski students and faculty gather in Turley for meals. Students and faculty eat together in a family-style setup. This long-standing school tradition reflects the school's early preceptorial structure.

Zeigler Science Center
Zeigler Science Center (ZSC) houses the school's physics and STEAM courses as well as biology and life sciences. The building provides a transitional space for teachers to move from lecture to experiment with movable classroom furniture.

Makerspace
The Makerspace is located in the Heath Classroom Building and provides a suite of hand tools and consumable materials, including a CNC router, laser cutter, and 3D printers. The Makerspace plays host to the school's Inventionland curriculum, where students build, market, and pitch ideas for inventions, emphasizing graphic design, engineering, public speaking, and patent researching.

Yukevich Quadrangle
The Yukevich Quad is the center of the school's campus. Old Main, Zeigler Science Center, Heath Classroom Building, MacColl Dorm, Swank Student Center, Pidgeon Library, and the Rogers Fine Arts Center border the Quad. It features an ample green space where Kiski students play Disc golf or view outdoor movies.

Swank Student Center
The Swank Student Center (SSC) is near the main classroom building, the library, and the residence halls. The student center is the hub of campus life and a place for students' social interactions, personal interests, and leisure activities outside classroom hours. The SSC contains the school's college counseling office, campus bookstore, snack bar, radio station, TV gaming rooms, and a large fire pit on the back patio.

John A. Pidgeon Library
The John A. Pidgeon Library is the "learning commons" of The Kiski School. The  library, constructed and opened in 1993, provides many print and non-print resources for students and faculty members. The Bradley Reading Room offers a comfortable area for casual reading or study and houses current periodicals. Access to the online catalog, various subscription databases, and reference resources is available through the campus network. In addition to Kiski's shelf collection of more than 20,000 titles, the library is a member of ACCESS PA, a statewide online database of nearly 3,000 libraries. This database makes 44 million items available for borrowing from these libraries to Kiski students. Additionally, the library subscribes to several research databases covering history, literature, science, photo archives, biographical information, and other digital tools for research and study.

The school named the building after the former Head of School, Pidgeon, who served for 45 years.

Dormitories
Students live in double occupancy student rooms in six dormitories:

Typically, two or more faculty members—including their families and pets—live in apartments within each dormitory. All dormitories have a common social room, called the Day Room, with a television, DVD player, recreational furniture, and at least one table game such as pool, table tennis, or air hockey. The school furnishes each student with a bed, mattress, closet, or hanging space for clothes, a desk, a desk chair, and a chest of drawers in the dorm rooms. All dormitory rooms have wireless access to the campus network.

Notable alumni

References

External links

The Association of Boarding Schools profile
Boarding School Review profile
Niche profile

Boys' schools in Pennsylvania
Boarding schools in Pennsylvania
Educational institutions established in 1888
Boys' schools in the United States
Private high schools in Pennsylvania
Schools in Westmoreland County, Pennsylvania
Education in Pittsburgh area
1888 establishments in Pennsylvania
Preparatory schools in Pennsylvania